Angelita Lind Soliveras a.k.a. "The Angel of Puerto Rico" (born January 13, 1959) is a Puerto Rican track and field athlete.

Early years
Lind was born in the barrio Marin Bajo of Patillas, Puerto Rico into a poor family.  She received her primary and secondary education in her hometown.  Lind first participated in track and field events in the 7th grade and later continued participating for her high school. However, it wasn't until she became a student at the Inter-American University that she was asked by the Puerto Rican Olympic Committee to represent Puerto Rico in international sports events.

International competitions
Lind has represented the island and participated in three Central American and Caribbean Games (CAC) and won two gold medals, three silver medals and one bronze medal.  She also participated in three Pan American Games and in the 1984 Olympics celebrated in Los Angeles, California.

In the CAC of 1982, celebrated in Havana, Cuba, Lind  was the standard carrier of the Puerto Rican flag.  In those games, she won a gold medal in the 1,500 meter dash with a record time of 4:25.88 and a silver in the 800 meters dash in a controversial race in 2:04.24.  In that race, she crossed the finish line with two Cuban runners next to her.  Right at the finish line the two Cuban girls ran into each other and they both knocked Angelita down.  Lind's feet were crossing the finish line, but because the Cuban fell into Angelita from behind, it was the Cuban who actually crossed the finish line first; after a prolonged discussion which reached the central offices of the International Athletic Federation, it was decided that Lind arrived second.  They based their decision on a rule of track and field which states that the first torso across the finish line wins.

By this time there had been a lot of trouble between the Government of Puerto Rico, headed by pro-US statehood governor Carlos Romero Barceló, (who withheld economic support from the athletic delegation headed to Cuba), and the Puerto Rican Olympic Committee, presided by German Rieckehoff, which had to appeal directly to the people for donations. Lind's "fall" united the people of Puerto Rico and for the first time, they forgot about the fight between the Olympic Committee and the government and concentrated on the sport - these events also served to inspire future runners.

World Masters Athletics
Angelita Lind officially retired in 1992, however on July, 2003 at age 44, she returned to participate in the 1,500 dash in the World Masters Athletics championships, which were celebrated in San Juan, Puerto Rico.  She continues to hold the national record for the 800 meters dash and the 1,500 meters dash.

Later years
She earned her master's degree from the Interamerican University of Puerto Rico and is currently a professor of physical education. Lind also serves as assistant athletic director in the department of physical education at the Interamerican University of Puerto Rico campus in San German, Puerto Rico.  In 2004, she was inducted into the "Puerto Rican Sports Hall of Fame".

Achievements

See also

List of Puerto Ricans
History of women in Puerto Rico

References

External links
profile 

1959 births
Living people
People from Patillas, Puerto Rico
Puerto Rican female sprinters
Pan American Games competitors for Puerto Rico
Olympic track and field athletes of Puerto Rico
Athletes (track and field) at the 1979 Pan American Games
Athletes (track and field) at the 1983 Pan American Games
Athletes (track and field) at the 1987 Pan American Games
Athletes (track and field) at the 1991 Pan American Games
Athletes (track and field) at the 1984 Summer Olympics
Central American and Caribbean Games gold medalists for Puerto Rico
Central American and Caribbean Games silver medalists for Puerto Rico
Competitors at the 1982 Central American and Caribbean Games
Competitors at the 1986 Central American and Caribbean Games
Central American and Caribbean Games medalists in athletics
Interamerican University of Puerto Rico alumni
21st-century American women